Podhum is a village in the city of Livno in Canton 10, the Federation of Bosnia and Herzegovina, Bosnia and Herzegovina.

Poet and children's book author Bisera Alikadić (born 1939) was born in Podhum.

Demographics 

According to the 2013 census, its population was 684.

Footnotes

Bibliography 

 

Populated places in Livno